Carl Henry Nolting (July 31, 1874 – April 9, 1958) was an American politician who served in the Virginia House of Delegates, representing Louisa County.

References

External links 

1874 births
1958 deaths
Democratic Party members of the Virginia House of Delegates
20th-century American politicians
People from Louisa, Virginia